Kingdom of Sirohi or later Sirohi State (in colonial time) was an independent Hindu state in present-day Rajasthan state of India. The state was founded in 1311 CE and lasted for six centuries until its peaceful dissolution in 1949 CE, when it merged into the erstwhile Bombay State of India.

Geography
Sirohi State was in the Rajputana agency. It had an area  The territory was much broken up by hills and rocky ranges; the Aravalli range divided it into two portions, running from north-east to south-west. The south and south-east part of the territory is mountainous and rugged, containing the lofty Mount Abu, an isolated mass of granite rock, culminating in a cluster of hills, enclosing several valleys surrounded by rocky ridges, like great hollows. On both sides of the Aravallis the country is intersected with numerous water channels, which run with considerable force and volume during the height of the rainy season, but are dry for the greater part of the year. The only river of any importance is the Western Banas.

In 1911 the Encyclopædia Britannica Eleventh Edition recorded that a large portion of the state was covered with dense jungle, in which wild animals, including the tiger, bear and leopard, abounded; and that the climate was on the whole dry (in the south and east there was usually a fair amount of rain.

During the 19th century the Rajputana Railway was built.

In 1901 the population of the state was 154,544, showing a decrease of 17% in the decade, due to the results of famine. Gross revenue was £28,000, tribute to the British Raj was £450. The population of the town of Sirohi was 5,651 and its main business was the manufacturing of sword-blades and other weapons.

History

Sirohi State was founded in c. 1311 by Lumbha, who conquered the area which later formed the state. In 1311, then-ruler Shivabhan established the capital of the state at Shivpuri, 3 kilometers east of the present-day town of Sirohi. In 1425, Rao Sains Mal built the town of Sirohi, while later became the capital of the state. The rulers of this state belong to Deora Chauhan clan of Rajputs. In 1452, the state was attacked by Rana Kumbha of Mewar.

During the early years of the 19th century, Sirohi suffered much from wars with Jodhpur and the hill tribes of the area. The protection of the British was sought in 1817; the pretensions of Jodhpur to suzerainty over Sirohi were disallowed, and in 1823 a treaty was concluded with the British government. Sirohi became a self-governing princely state within British India, and part of the Rajputana Agency.

For services rendered during the Revolt of 1857, the Rao received a remission of half his tribute. Rao Keshri Singh (ruled 1875-1920) and his successors were granted the title Maharao (equivalent to Maharaja) in 1889.

When India became independent in 1947, there was no immediate consensus about whether Sirohi State should be merged with the new states of Bombay or Rajasthan. Initially, the area under Sirohi State was merged into Bombay 1949, but was transferred to Rajasthan in 1950.

List of rulers 

Rao Alhana, the Chauhan ruler of Nadol's  ancestors were rulers of Jalor, Chandrawati and Sirohi.

List of Raos 

Raos of Jalore

 Rao Shri Alhana
 Rao Shri Kirtipal – founder of Jalore in 1181, and ancestor of the  Songara Chauhan clan.
 Rao Shri Samarsinha
 Rao Shri Udaysinha
 Rao Shri Man Singh I (1213–1228)
 Rao Shri Devraj (1228–1250)
 Rao Shri Vijayraj Singh (1250–1311)

Raos of Chandrawati

 Rao Shri Lumba (1311–1321)– founder of Sirohi in 1311
 Rao Shri Tej Singh (1321–1336)
 Rao Shri Kanhar Dev (1336–1343)
 Rao Shri Samant Singh (1343–?)
 Rao Shri Salkha (?–1374)

Raos of Sirohi

 Rao Shri Ranmal (1374–1392)
 Rao Shri Sobhajit (Shivbhan) (1392–1424)
 Rao Shri Sahasmal (Sainsmal) (1424–1451)
 Rao Shri Lakharaj Singh (1451–1483)
 Rao Shri Jagmal I (1483–1523)

List of Maharaos 

 Maharao Shri Akshayraj I (1523–1533)
 Maharao Shri Rai Singh (1533–1543)
 Maharao Shri Dudaji (Durjan Sal) (1543–1553)
 Maharao Shri Udai Singh I (1553–1562)
 Maharao Shri Man Singh II (1562–1572)
 Maharao Shri Surtan Singh (1572–1610)
 Maharao Shri Rai Singh II (1610–1620)
 Maharao Shri Akheraj II (1620–1673)
 Maharao Shri Udaibhan II (1673–1676)
 Maharao Shri Varisal Singh I (1676–1697)
 Maharao Shri Surtan Singh II (1697),(deposed)
 Maharao Shri Chattarsal Singh (Durjan Singh) (1697–1705)
 Maharao Shri Umaid Singh (Maan Singh III) (1705–1749)
 Maharao Shri Prithviraj Singh (1749–1772)
 Maharao Shri Takhat Singh (1772–1781)
 Maharao Shri Jagat Singh (1781–1782)
 Maharao Shri Bairisal II (Varisal) (1782–1809)
 Maharao Shri Udaibhan Singh (1809–1817)
 Maharao Shri Sheo Singh (1817–1846)
 Maharao Shri Umaid Singh II Bahadur (1862–1875)
 HH Maharao Kesari Singh Bahadur (1875–1920)
 HH Maharao Shri Sarupram Singh Bahadur (1920–1946)
 Maharao Shri Tejram Singh Bahadur (1946–1947)
 Maharani Krishna (Kunverba) (1946–1947)

Titular ruler 

 Maharao Raghubir Singh Bahadur (1947–1950)
 Maharao Abhai Singh Bahadur (1950–1998)

Revenue system
The traditional practice of revenue collection consisted of bhog batai and halbandi. Bhog batai, the more prevalent practice, consisted of direct collection of a part of the harvested produce by the state. In some areas of the state, halbandi was used, under which a cash tax was imposed on the implements used by farmers. In 1904, a new revenue-collection system was introduced which consisted of revenue collection based on average productivity of the cultivated area as the criterion for payment. From the state's perspective, the new revenue system was largely successful, leading to a large increase in the state's revenue.

See also 
Jodhpur State
Udaipur State
Mewar Residency
Rajputana

References

Sources

External links

14th-century establishments in India
1311 establishments in Asia
1949 disestablishments in India
Princely states of Rajasthan
Sirohi district
States and territories established in 1311
States and territories disestablished in 1949
Rajputs